The Bridge is the tenth studio album by American singer-songwriter Billy Joel, released on July 9, 1986. It was Joel's last studio album produced by Phil Ramone as well as the last to feature Joel's long-time bassist Doug Stegmeyer and rhythm guitarist Russell Javors. The album yielded several successful singles, including "A Matter of Trust" (peaking at No. 10), "Modern Woman" (which also appeared on the Ruthless People soundtrack, peaking at No. 10), and "This Is the Time" (peaking at No. 18).

Background
Joel began work on the album—on which two of his major influences (Ray Charles and Steve Winwood) made guest appearances—in 1985. Charles sang a duet with Joel on the song "Baby Grand", and Winwood played Hammond organ on the song "Getting Closer"; Charles and Winwood later covered "Baby Grand" and "Getting Closer" respectively in concert. Other notable musicians who made guest appearances on the album include jazz musicians Ron Carter and Michael Brecker, who both played on the jazzy track "Big Man on Mulberry Street".

The album also had some New wave influences. For instance, the first song, "Running on Ice", is heavily influenced by the music of the Police, and "Modern Woman" borrows heavily from the styles of Huey Lewis and the News. The final song recorded for the album, "Code of Silence", featured Cyndi Lauper who contributed backing vocals and received co-writing credit for the lyrics; she later covered that song herself in concert. Joel would return the favor by contributing backing vocals on Lauper's song "Maybe He'll Know" for her 1986 album True Colors.

The Bridge was Joel's last album to carry the "Family Productions" logo which had appeared on all of Joel's albums up to that time as part of a deal that Columbia Records made to get Joel out of his first recording contract with Artie Ripp's Family Productions. In the closing song of the album—"Getting Closer"—Joel makes several of what are clearly attacks and observations on the iron-clad contract with Ripp, with references to "my stolen youth", "all the conmen and their acrobats who stomped me in the ground", and "I must live up to contracts".

Critical reception 
Reviewing in Christgau's Record Guide: The '80s (1990), Robert Christgau said: "Maybe [Joel's] youthful lyricism, meaning his knack for the tearjerker, is abandoning him. … Here he's best when he's brassy and literal: failed wise guy in 'Big Man on Mulberry Street,' Ray Charles's coequal on 'Baby Grand.' And even at his most rockin' he's seventy-five years retro whether he likes it or not—whenever he doesn't hit it just right you want to quarantine him for life in Atlantic City."

In a retrospective interview, Joel said: "Not a happy album. I wasn’t simpatico with the musicians, some of whom I’d been working with a long time. I don’t think the material was good; I was pressured by management to put it out too fast. By the end, I sort of gave up caring, which for me was unusual. I remember reading bad reviews and agreeing with them."

Billy later admitted to Rolling Stone that at the time of the album's writing and recording, he was in no mood to be in the studio, saying "Christie and I had just had Alexa, and I'd have much rather have been home with the baby..." This angst over leaving his wife and daughter at home was poured into the album track "Temptation".

Track listing
All songs composed by Billy Joel, except "Code of Silence" written by Joel and Cyndi Lauper.

Side one
"Running on Ice" – 3:15
"This Is the Time" – 4:59
"A Matter of Trust" – 4:09
"Modern Woman" – 3:48
"Baby Grand" (duet with Ray Charles) – 4:02

Side two
"Big Man on Mulberry Street" – 5:26
"Temptation" – 4:12
"Code of Silence" (backing vocals by Cyndi Lauper) – 5:15
"Getting Closer" – 5:00

Personnel 
 Billy Joel – lead and backing vocals, acoustic piano (1-3, 5–9), synthesizers (1–4, 6–8), electric guitar (3), Fender Rhodes (9)
 David Brown – guitar (1–4, 6, 8, 9), 12-string acoustic guitar (8)
 Russell Javors – guitar (1–4, 6, 8, 9)
 Liberty DeVitto – drums (1–4, 6–9), percussion (9)
 Doug Stegmeyer – bass guitar (1–4, 6, 7, 8)
 Mark Rivera – tenor saxophone (4), alto saxophone (7)

Additional personnel
 Rob Mounsey – synthesizer (1), orchestration (2, 4, 6)
 Jeff Bova – synthesizer (3, 8), orchestration (7)
 Ray Charles – acoustic piano (5), lead vocals (5)
 Steve Winwood – Hammond B3 organ (9)
 Dean Parks – guitar (5)
 John McCurry – guitar (9)
 Neil Stubenhaus – bass guitar (5)
 Ron Carter – acoustic bass (6)
 Neil Jason – bass guitar (9)
 Vinnie Colaiuta – drums (5)
 Jimmy Bralower – percussion (4)
 Eddie Daniels – alto saxophone (6)
 Michael Brecker – tenor saxophone (6)
 Ronnie Cuber – baritone saxophone (6)
 Dave Bargeron – trombone (6)
 Marvin Stamm – trumpet (6)
 Alan Rubin – trumpet (6)
 Don Brooks – harmonica (8)
 Patrick Williams – arrangements (5)
 Philippe Saisse – orchestration (7)
 Peter Hewlett – backing vocals (1)
 Cyndi Lauper – harmony vocals (8)

Production
 Producer – Phil Ramone
 Production coordinator – Joseph D'Ambrosio
 Engineer – Jim Boyer
 Associate engineers – Steve Boyer, David Dickson, Bradshaw Leigh and Fred Tenny.
 Technical support – Ricki Begin, Peter Bergren, Mark Betts, Steve Buller, Cary Butler, Gary Ciuzio, Ed Evans, Bruce Howell, Joe Lopes, Frank Rodriguez, Billy Rothschild, Joe Salvatto, Audrey Tanaka and Phil Vachon.
 Support system – Barry Bongiovi, Jim Flynn and The Power Station staff.
 Digitally recorded at The Power Station, Chelsea Sound and RCA Recording Studios (New York, NY); Evergreen Studios (Burbank, CA).
 Mixed at The Power Station (New York, NY).
 Mastering by Ted Jensen at Sterling Sound (New York, NY).
 Acoustic piano supplied by Yamaha.
 Design – Mark Larson
 Cover painting – Brad Holland
 Photography – Patrick Demarchelier
 Sleeve photos – Larry Busacca, Phil Ramone and Charles Reilly.

Charts

Weekly charts

Year-end charts

Certifications

Singles

References

Billy Joel albums
1986 albums
Albums produced by Phil Ramone
Columbia Records albums
Albums arranged by Patrick Williams (composer)